The Palestinian Authority Government of November 2003 was a government of the Palestinian National Authority (PA) sworn in on 12 November 2003 and continued until 24 February 2005. It was headed by Ahmed Qurei, the Prime Minister of the Palestinian National Authority. The new 24-member Cabinet was approved by Palestinian Legislative Council on 12 November with 46 votes to 13, and 5 abstentions.

Background
Pursuant to the Oslo Accords and the Gaza–Jericho Agreement, the Palestinian Authority had limited powers to some civil rights of the Palestinians in the West Bank Areas A and B and in the Gaza Strip, and to internal security in Area A and in Gaza.

On 6 September 2003, Mahmoud Abbas resigned as Prime Minister and President Arafat asked Ahmed Qurei to become PM of an emergency government. Following a suicide bombing in Haifa on 4 October, Israel threatened to "remove" Arafat and urged him to act within 48 hours.

The next day, on 5 October 2003, Arafat installed, by presidential decree, an eight-member emergency government headed by Qurei. Arafat and Qurei disagreed as to who was to be Interior Minister in the next government. Qurei wanted General Nasser Yousef, while Arafat preferred Hakam Balawi. On 4 November, the term of the emergency cabinet expired. Hours before the 30-day term expired at midnight, Arafat transformed the Cabinet into a caretaker government.

Timeline 
On 12 November 2003, a new 24-member government was presented to the Palestinian Legislative Council and approved with 46 votes to 13, and 5 abstentions. Balawi was Interior Minister.

On 17 July 2004, Qurei submitted his resignation amid growing chaos in the Gaza Strip. Offices of the Palestinian authority in Gaza were burned down, and gunmen briefly abducted four French aid workers, the police chief and another official, demanding reforms. Arafat refused to accept Qurei's resignation. Arafat and Qurei disagreed on Qurei's demand for more authority to restructure and control the Palestinian Security Services to reduce the growing turmoil. Denying the demand, Arafat decreed a state of emergency in Gaza, and Qurei retracted his resignation. On 27 July, Arafat and Qurei held a press conference after reaching a settlement in a cabinet meeting.

After Arafat's death in November 2004 and Mahmoud Abbas' subsequent victory in the Palestinian presidential election in January 2005, Qurei was asked to continue in his post as caretaker prime minister and form a new government. The next government was formed on 24 February 2005, also headed by Qurei.

Members of the Government
November 2003 to February 2005

See also 
Palestinian government

References

External links 
Palestinian prime minister Abbas resigns. CNN, 6 September 2003

Palestinian National Authority governments
2003 establishments in the Palestinian territories
Cabinets established in 2003
2005 disestablishments in the Palestinian territories
Cabinets disestablished in 2005